King Historic District is a national historic district located at King, Stokes County, North Carolina. The district encompasses 72 contributing buildings and 1 contributing structure in the central business district and surrounding residential sections of King.  They were built between about 1914 to the 1950s and include notable examples of Colonial Revival and Bungalow / American Craftsman architecture. Notable buildings include the Bank of King, King Drug Company, Simeon Wesley Pulliam House (c. 1907), James Robert Hutchins House (c. 1905), King Milling Company (c. 1920), and King Moravian Church (c. 1925).

It was added to the National Register of Historic Places in 2002.

References

Historic districts on the National Register of Historic Places in North Carolina
Colonial Revival architecture in North Carolina
Buildings and structures in Stokes County, North Carolina
National Register of Historic Places in Stokes County, North Carolina